The gopher rockfish (Sebastes carnatus), also known as the gopher sea perch, is a species of marine ray-finned fish belonging to the subfamily Sebastinae, the rockfishes, part of the family Scorpaenidae. It is found in the eastern Pacific, primarily off California.

Taxonomy
The gopher rockfish was originally described in 1880 as Sebastichthys carnatus by the American ichthyologists David Starr Jordan and Charles Henry Gilbert with the type locality given as the Monterey Bay, California. Some authorities place this species in the subgenus Pteropodus. The specific name carnatus means "fleshy" or "flesh-colored", alluding to the background color of this fish.

Description
The gopher rockfish is a deep, stout bodied fish with a steep dorsal profile. The body is as deep as 34% to 38% of its standard length. They have many spines on the head and body. The overall color is dark brown, black, and greenish fading to reddish brown on the belly. There is a row of flesh-colored or whitish spotting and blotches on their back reaching up to and onto the dorsal fin and irregular pale patches on their flanks. There is a dark stripe running rearwards from the eye and another on the upper jaw. The head is of average length for this genus and has a short snout with a small terminal mouth and large eyes which bulge over the dorsal profile of the head. The caudal fin is truncate. The dorsal fin has 13 spines and 12 to 14 rays while the anal fin has 3 spines and 5 to 7 soft rays.

Distribution and habitat
Gopher rockfish are found in the northeastern Pacific Ocean off the Western coast of North America. They are known from as far north as Cape Blanco in Oregon, down to Punta San Roque in southern Baja California. They are commonest between northern Baja California and Northern California.

Biology
The gopher rockfish is a territorial species which defends a home territory on the seabed excluding other rockfish. It is a nocturnal fish, spending the day sheltering in cavities and crevices. They leave their shelter ar dusk to forage. The juveniles feed on planktonic crustaceans while the adults prey on cephalopods, gastropods, brittle stars, crabs, shrimp and polychaetes. They also eat smaller fish such as juvenile rockfish, particularly blue rockfish (Sebastes mystinus), sculpins, juvenile surfperch, kelpfishes, and plainfin midshipman (Porichthys notatus). This is an oviparous species in which a female can lay 175,000 to 425,000 pelagic eggs. They are known to live for up to 30 years.

Genetics
A PCR-RFLP genetic sex marker has been identified for gopher rockfish, which can successfully distinguish males and females. The marker potentially also works in the closely related black-and-yellow rockfish, but it does not seem to successfully distinguish males and females in various other rockfish species.

References

 
 Milton S. Love, Mary Yoklavich, Lyman K. Thorsteinson, (2002), The Rockfishes of the Northeast Pacific, University of California Press, pp. 140–143

 Shawn Narum, Vincent Buonaccorsi, Carol Kimbrell, and Russell Vetter.  (2004). Genetic Divergence between Gopher Rockfish (Sebastes carnatus) and Black and Yellow Rockfish (Sebastes chrysomelas).  Copeia, 4, pp. 926–931.

gopher rockfish
Taxa named by David Starr Jordan
Taxa named by Charles Henry Gilbert
Fauna of California
Western North American coastal fauna
gopher rockfish